The Cabin in the Mountains is a 2014 Chinese suspense crime film written and directed by Gary Tang. The film stars Gregory Wong, Sienna Li, Mark Du, Ava Yu, A.Lin Pei, Sukie Wing-Lee Shek, Wei Yuhai, and Gu Shangwei. It was released in China on Valentine's Day.

Cast
 Gregory Wong as Jian Ming.
 Sienna Li as Na Na.
 Mark Du as Zhen Bang.
 Ava Yu as Mei Jin.
 A.Lin Pei as Bai Zhi.
 Sukie Wing-Lee Shek as Hai Di.
 Wei Yuhai as Jia Jie.
 Gu Shangwei as Ren Bao.

Released
Mei Ah Entertainment released a trailer for The Cabin in the Mountains in Guangzhou on January 22, 2014.

The film grossed ￥4 million on its first three days and received positive reviews.

References

2014 films
2010s Mandarin-language films
Films set in Vietnam
Films shot in Vietnam
Films shot in Guangzhou
Chinese crime drama films